Maga Rahi is a village in West Champaran district in the Indian state of Bihar.

Demographics
As of 2011 India census, Maga Rahi had a population of 1983 in 327 households. Males constitute 52.84% of the population and females 47.15%. Maga Rahi has an average literacy rate of 44.32%, lower than the national average of 74%: male literacy is 67.12%, and female literacy is 32.87%. In Maga Rahi, 21.43% of the population is under 6 years of age.

References

Villages in West Champaran district